Láb is a village and municipality in western Slovakia in Malacky District in the Bratislava region.

Etymology
The name derives from Loyp (Leopold). Terra Loyp (1206), silva Loyp (1271), Laab (1400).

References

External links

 Official page
https://web.archive.org/web/20070513023228/http://www.statistics.sk/mosmis/eng/run.html

Villages and municipalities in Malacky District